Turricula, turret in Latin, may refer to:
 Turricula (plant), a plant genus in the subfamily Hydrophylloideae
 Turricula (gastropod), an animal genus in the family Clavatulidae